Morgan William (born July 14, 1996) is an American women's college basketball player who previously played for the Mississippi State Bulldogs. She helped lead the Bulldogs to four appearances in the NCAA tournament, including three Sweet Sixteens, and two appearances in the championship game, 2017 and 2018. She is best known for a buzzer-beating shot to beat Connecticut in the 2017 Final Four, ending the Huskies' 111-game winning streak.

Mississippi State statistics 

Source

References

1996 births
Living people
American women's basketball players
Basketball players from Alabama
Mississippi State Bulldogs women's basketball players
Point guards